Poort means port in Dutch and may refer to
Places in the Netherlands
Almere Poort, a borough (stadsdeel) of Almere
Almere Poort railway station 
Amsterdamse Poort (disambiguation)
Gebouw Delftse Poort, a twin-tower skyscraper in Rotterdam
Haagse Poort, an office building in The Hague

Places in South Africa
Hex River Poort Pass, a mountain pass
Howieson's Poort Shelter, an archeological site 
Howiesons Poort, a cultural period in the Stone Age named after the shelter
Wyllie's Poort, a road pass 

Other
Poort (surname)